The Eliminator is a 2004 direct-to-video action film starring UFC champion Bas Rutten. The film was directed by Ken Barbet.

Plot
Former LAPD cop, Dakota Varley (Bas Rutten), enters a power boat race seeking the prize of $250,000, but immediately discovers, first hand, that this race's risk matches the prize: one racer is killed, three others seriously injured in crashes and explosions. Varley tries to leave the lake and collect his prize money but is drugged and kidnapped by Dawson (Michael Rooker) and thrown into a different world: a world where survival means everything and no one follows the rules. Varley awakens on an island, strapped to pole, like a pig being carried to a barbecue. Surrounded by heavily armed men, he soon learns that he and six other victims have been assembled to be contestants in the ultimate survival game: they will be stalked nightly by hunters with rifles until there is one remaining survivor, who will win a $10,000,000 cash prize. As the story unfolds, the other contestants are introduced: Jesse, an undercover DEA agent in Venezuela; Santha, a military instructor for a group of revolutionaries in Sierra Leone; and Darius, a sociopathic murderer, court-martialed and supposedly imprisoned by the U.S. Army for slaughtering 40 innocents in Kosovo. It is also learned, in bits and pieces, that each contestant has been brought to the game by a "Player": wealthy men and women who have each selected of one of the contestants. Among these men are Carlos Alvarez, Venezuelan Drug Lord; U.S. Army General Ellison; and Ochiro Sumanni, a Japanese Gang Boss. All the while, the contestants struggle to survive the attacks not only by the hunters, but also from each other.

Cast
Michael Rooker as Miles Dawson
Bas Rutten as Dakota Varley
Dana Lee as Ichiro Sumanni
G. Anthony Joseph as Warden Sutherland
Wolf Muser as Deitrich Kemmel
Marco Ruas as Salvador
Michael Gregory as General Ellison
Gareth Myles as Watson
Geoffrey Forward as Sir Crawley
Jamal Duff as Darius Blake
Ivo Cutzarida as Alvarez
Danielle Burgio as Santha
Paul Logan as Jesse
Vicki Phillips as Tonya
Stephen Wozniak as Rocker

References

External links
The Eliminator (2004)

2004 films
Films about death games
American action films
2004 action films
Direct-to-video action films
2000s English-language films
2000s American films